Sulochrin oxidase may refer to:

 Sulochrin oxidase ((+)-bisdechlorogeodin-forming)
 Sulochrin oxidase ((-)-bisdechlorogeodin-forming)